Julia Margaret Cross  is a 6th degree black belt in ITF Taekwon-Do and a martial arts instructor. She is a six-time ITF Taekwon-Do World Champion and 15 time European Champion. Julia Cross is the only person, male or female, ever to achieve six world titles in ITF Taekwon-Do.

Career 
Julia Cross took her first martial arts class at age eleven. In 1991 she traveled to Vienna for her first European championship. She became a world champion for the first time in 1999, in Argentina. She continued to win world titles and was inducted into the Taekwon-Do Hall of Fame in 2007, being the first person to ever win six Taekwon-Do world titles. In 2010, Julia Cross needed a hip replacement and was forced to retire from competition. She received her 5th degree black belt in 2011, and teaches at South Queensferry School of Taekwon-Do.4

Cross was appointed Member of the Order of the British Empire (MBE) in the 2020 Birthday Honours for services to taekwon-do.

Titles 
Julia Cross has won numerous titles in her Taekwon-Do career.

 WORLD SILVER 2009: ARGENTINA - Female -58 kg Sparring
 2007: QUEBEC - Female -58 kg Sparring
 Winner of 1st Hall of Fame Best Female Competitor
 2005: GERMANY - Female -58 kg Sparring
 2005: GERMANY - Female 3rd degree Patterns
 Received Award for Best Overall Female
 2003: POLAND - Female -58 kg Sparring
 2003: POLAND - Female 3rd Degree Patterns
 Received Award for Best overall female
 1999: ARGENTINA - Female -58 kg Sparring
 Received Award For Best Overall Female
 WORLD SILVER 1997: RUSSIA - Female 3rd degree Patterns
 WORLD BRONZE 1992: NORTH KOREA - Female -58 kg Sparring
 European Championship Medals European Golds - 15
 1991: Vienna
 1994: Poland
 1996: Italy
 1997: Slovenia
 1999: Italy
 2000: Edinburgh - 2 Gold including BEST FEMALE COMPETITOR
 2001: Spain
 2002: Czech Rep -1 Gold & 1 Silver including BEST FEMALE COMPETITOR
 2004: Finland
 2005: Italy
 2006: Romania
 2007: Slovakia - 2 GOLD including BEST OVERALL FEMALE
 2008: Wroclaw - Poland
 SILVER MEDALS - 5
 1993: Holland
 1995: Germany
 1999: Italy
 2001: Spain
 2002: Czech Rep
 2008: Wroclaw-Poland
 BRONZE MEDALS - 3
 1991: Vienna
 1995: Germany
 2006: Romania
 Other Tournaments
 FINNISH OPEN (FINLAND): CHAMPION 2003 - 2 Gold Medals
 SWEDISH VIKING CUP: CHAMPION 2004 - 2 Gold Medals
 SWEDISH VIKING CUP: CHAMPION 2005 - 2 Gold Medals
 SWEDISH VIKING CUP: CHAMPION 2006 - 1 Gold, 1 Silver
 CHAMPION OF CHAMPIONS (ENGLAND) 2004 - 3 Gold Medals
 IMPACT OPEN 2005 - 2 Gold Medals
 SCOTTISH CHAMPION: 1989-2003(inclusive), 2006 BRITISH CHAMPION: 1989-2002(inclusive) ENGLISH CHAMPION: 1989, 1990 and 1998 WELSH CHAMPION: 1995 and 1997 ITALIAN OPEN CHAMPION: 1998, 1999 and 2000 - 2 gold medals in each year
 IRISH OPEN MARCH 2007: GOLD SPARRING & GOLD PATTERN

References 

1974 births
Living people
Scottish female taekwondo practitioners
Sportspeople from Edinburgh
Members of the Order of the British Empire